HMS Satyr was an S-class submarine of the Royal Navy, and part of the third group built of that class. She was built by Scotts, of Greenock and launched on 28 September 1942.

Design and description

The S-class submarines were designed to patrol the restricted waters of the North Sea and the Mediterranean Sea. The third batch was slightly enlarged and improved over the preceding second batch of the S class. They displaced  on the surface and  submerged. The S-class submarines had a crew of 48 officers and ratings.

For surface running, the boats were powered by two  diesel engines, each driving one propeller shaft. When submerged each propeller was driven by a  electric motor. They could reach  on the surface and  underwater.

The third-batch submarines were armed with seven 21-inch (533 mm) torpedo tubes. A half-dozen of these were in the bow and there was one external tube in the stern. They carried six reload torpedoes for the bow tubes for a total of thirteen torpedoes. Twelve mines could be carried in lieu of the internally stowed torpedoes. They were also armed with a 3-inch (76 mm) deck gun. It is uncertain if Satyr was completed with a  Oerlikon light AA gun or had one added later. The third-batch S-class boats were fitted with either a Type 129AR or 138 ASDIC system and a Type 291 or 291W early-warning radar.

Career
Satyr spent much of her wartime career serving in home waters, where she sank the Norwegian merchant , and the German submarine . She also torpedoed the wreck of the German merchant Emsland which was aground off Stadlandet, Norway after being heavily damaged by British torpedo bombers on 20 January 1944. On 11 February the wreck was hit again by aerial torpedoes. Satyr also unsuccessfully attacked the German merchants Bochum and Emma Sauber, and a German convoy off Egersund, Norway.

During 1944–1945 Satyr was disarmed, streamlined and given more powerful batteries to serve as a high speed target submarine.

She was lent to the French navy between February 1952 and August 1961, and renamed Saphir. After 20 years of service, she was broken up in April 1962 at Charlestown, Fife.

References

Bibliography
 
 
 
 
 
 
 

 

British S-class submarines (1931)
Ships built on the River Clyde
1942 ships
World War II submarines of the United Kingdom
Saphir-class submarines (1951)